This is a list in alphabetical order of cricketers who have played first-class cricket for the Oxford University Centre of Cricketing Excellence (UCCE) and/or Oxford MCC University (MCCU).

The UCCE team first played cricket in 2000, and played its first first-class matches in 2001. Players attend either Oxford University or Oxford Brookes University. The UCCE team continued until the 2009 season, when the Marylebone Cricket Club (MCC) took over funding from the England and Wales Cricket Board (ECB), at which point it was renamed Oxford MCC University. MCC funding came to an end in July 2020, although no matches were played in the 2020 season due to restrictions in place during the COVID-19 pandemic. In December 2019 the ECB announced that matches with MCCU teams would lose their first-class status as of the 2021 season.

Players listed are those who have played first-class cricket for the side, in either the UCCE or the MCCU team. Some players will have played senior cricket for other teams, including for Oxford University Cricket Club (OUCC). That is a separate side which selects players only from Oxford University. Those who played only for OUCC are not included in this list.

A

B

C

D

E
Edward Ellis
Charlie Ellison

F

G

H

J

K

L

M

O
Salil Oberoi

P

R

S

T
Matthew Taylor
Jamie Thompson

W

Y
Ed Young
Peter Young

Z
Zaman Akhter

References

Oxford UCCE and MCCU
Sport at the University of Oxford
Student cricket in the United Kingdom